Microprotopus maculatus is a species of crustacean. It is belong to Microprotopus genus and Microprotopidae family. It was described by Alfred Merle Norman in 1867.

Description 
Microprotopus maculatus approximately length is 3 mm. It has blackish densely mottled. This species lives between depth range from 0 to 70 meters and often on sandy bottoms.

Distribution 
Microprotopus maculatus mainly found in the European waters such as North-East Atlantic, North Sea; particularity from Isefjord to the Adriatic. Also, significant amount found in the North American waters, Mediterranean and Indian ocean.

References

External links 

Crustaceans of Europe
Crustaceans of the Atlantic Ocean
Crustaceans described in 1867